The 2015–16 North Florida Ospreys men's basketball team represented the University of North Florida during the 2015–16 NCAA Division I men's basketball season. The Ospreys were led by seventh-year head coach Matthew Driscoll and played their home games at UNF Arena on the university's campus in Jacksonville, Florida as members of the Atlantic Sun Conference (A-Sun).

For the second year in a row, the Ospreys won the A-Sun regular season championship. They finished the season 22–12, 10–4 in A-Sun play. Guard Dallas Moore was named A-Sun Player of the Year, the first such award for a North Florida player.  Driscoll and his staff were named A-Sun Coaching Staff of the Year for the second year in a row.

As the No.1 seed in the Atlantic Sun tournament, they advanced to the semifinals where they were upset at home by Florida Gulf Coast. As a regular season conference champion who failed to win their conference tournament, the Ospreys received an automatic bid to the National Invitation Tournament. As a No. 7 seed, the Ospreys hosted the No. 2 seed Florida in the first round, where they fell 97–68.

The Ospreys made the most three point shots (402) out of all NCAA Division I teams in the 2015–16 season, earning them the nickname "Birds of Trey".

Previous season
The Ospreys finished the 2014–15 season with a program-best overall record of 23–12, and a 12–2 record in conference play. They won the Atlantic Sun Conference tournament and advanced to the NCAA tournament for the first time. As a No. 16 seed in the South Region, they were defeated 81–77 by fellow No. 16 seed Robert Morris in the First Four in Dayton, Ohio.

Preseason
Before the season, Driscoll agreed to a four-year contract extension to remain the team's head coach through 2022.

The Ospreys were picked as preseason favorites to retain their A-Sun Conference title by coaches and media. Multiple players received preseason all-conference honors, including guard/forward Beau Beech who was named A-Sun Preseason Player of the Year.

Roster

Schedule and results

November
The Ospreys carried their previous season's momentum right into their first game by earning a road upset of Illinois by a score of 93–81.  In a game that UNF never trailed, the Ospreys set a program record (at the time) for three-point-shots made with 17.  It was the program's second victory over a Big Ten Conference opponent, with the first coming in December 2014 at Purdue.  In their home opener, the Ospreys blew out Texas–Rio Grande Valley, 106–84.  For the second straight game they connected on 17 three-point-shots, tying the program record.  They improved to 2–0 for the first time since the 2005–06 season.  It was just the third time UNF has reached 100 points since joining Division I.  Guard Dallas Moore recorded his second straight double-double and became UNF's 11th player to score 1,000 career points.  On November 18, coach Matthew Driscoll surpassed Matt Kilcullen to become the winningest coach in program history with a 98–69 win over crosstown rival and NAIA member Edward Waters.  With the win, UNF started the season 3–0 for the first time since the 1994–95 season when they were members of Division II.  Over the next two games, the Ospreys trailed at halftime by only two points at Louisville and one point at Saint Louis, however, they went on to lose those games by margins of 28 and 13 respectively.  They won three consecutive games to finish November with a record of 6–2.

December
On December 2, Moore and Beech each scored 31 points (a career high for Beech) in a 108–119 loss at LSU.  The Ospreys led 56–48 at halftime, but 43 points by freshman phenom Ben Simmons proved too much for UNF to handle.  The Ospreys once again set a program record for three-point-shots made with 19.  In their next game, they trailed at Dayton by only three points at halftime, but lost by a margin of 15.   On December 12 against Coastal Georgia, the Ospreys scored the most points in program history with a 117–71 victory.  In December, North Florida swept a four-game home stand to extend their winning streak at UNF Arena to 14 games, a program record.  The Ospreys then lost two in a row at Arkansas and at VCU to close out the month of December.

January
On January 2, the Ospreys won at Eastern Michigan, 82–77, to finish their non-conference schedule with a record of 11–6.  In the game, senior forward Demarcus Daniels set the program record for career blocks with 146.  Their 11 wins marked the most non-conference victories in program history.  On January 9, the Ospreys defeated crosstown rival Jacksonville for the fifth time in a row in the River City Rumble. On January 16, the Ospreys defeated Kennesaw State, 93–78, despite trailing by 14 points in the first half.  In the game, guard Beau Beech scored a career high 33 points, and UNF extended its home winning streak to 17 games.  On January 24 in a win at NJIT, the Ospreys made a program record 20 three-point-shots, a record that was broken or tied four times in the 2015–16 season.

February
The Ospreys had improved to 7–0 in conference play until losing at home to Stetson on February 1.  The loss snapped an 18-game home winning streak.  The Ospreys lost the following three games, all on the road, to fall into a three-way tie for first place in the A-Sun at  7–4.  They snapped their losing streak by defeating NJIT at home, 107–71 on February 18.  On February 20, the Ospreys clinched at least a share of the Atlantic Sun regular season title by defeating USC Upstate, 81–78. They secured the regular season championship and No. 1 seed in the Atlantic Sun Tournament with a win at crosstown rival Jacksonville.

March
The Ospreys began their quest to win back-to-back Atlantic Sun Tournament titles by defeating USC Upstate in the quarterfinals, 92–69.  However, they were blown-out by 33 points in the semifinals by Florida Gulf Coast.  Their 56 points were the fewest they scored in any game this season.  Due to renovations at the O'Connell Center, the 7-seed Ospreys hosted the 2-seed Florida Gators in the first round of the 2016 National Invitation Tournament, where they fell 97–68 in front of 6,011 fans at the UNF Arena. 
  

|-
!colspan=9 style="background:#031B49; color:white;"| Non-conference regular season

|-
!colspan=9 style="background:#031B49; color:white;"| Atlantic Sun Conference regular season

|-
!colspan=9 style="background:#031B49; color:white;"| Atlantic Sun tournament

|-
!colspan=9 style="background:#031B49; color:white;"| National Invitation tournament

Source:

NOTES:
Game postponed from Saturday, January 23 at 4 pm to Sunday, January 24 at 6 pm due to Winter Storm Jonas.

Awards and honors 
 Beau Beech, guard
 Atlantic Sun All-Conference First Team
 Atlantic Sun Player of the Week (Jan. 11–17).  Beech averaged 27 points, 9 rebounds, and 3 assists in two wins over Lipscomb and Kennesaw State.
 Preseason Atlantic Sun Player of the Year
 Preseason Atlantic Sun All-Conference Team

 Demarcus Daniels, forward
 Atlantic Sun Defensive Player of the Year
 Atlantic Sun All-Academic Team
 Atlantic Sun Player of the Week (Jan. 4–10).  Daniels averaged 22 points, 9.5 rebounds, and 2.5 blocks in two wins over Stetson and Jacksonville.
 Atlantic Sun Co-Player of the Week (Feb. 15–21).  Daniels averaged 24 points, 6.5 rebounds, 2.5 assists, and 2.5 blocks in two wins over NJIT and USC Upstate.  Scored a career high 25 points versus NJIT.
 Preseason Atlantic Sun Defensive Player of the Year
 Preseason Atlantic Sun All-Conference Team

 Chris Davenport, forward
 Preseason Atlantic Sun All-Conference Team

 Head Coach Matthew Driscoll and staff
 Atlantic Sun Coaching Staff of the Year

 Trent Mackey, guard
 Atlantic Sun Scholar-Athlete of the Year
 Atlantic Sun All-Academic Team

 Dallas Moore, guard
 Atlantic Sun Player of the Year
 Atlantic Sun All-Conference First Team
 Atlantic Sun All-Tournament Team
 Atlantic Sun Co-Player of the Week (Nov. 13–15).  Moore recorded 26 points, 10 assists, and no turnovers in a road upset of Illinois.
 Atlantic Sun Player of the Week (Nov. 23–29).  Moore averaged 16.0 points, 8.7 rebounds, and 5.7 assists in a loss at Saint Louis, a win at Hartford, and a neutral site win over St. Francis Brooklyn.
 Atlantic Sun Player of the Week (Jan. 18–24).  Moore averaged 22.5 points, 5 rebounds, 6.5 assists, and 2.5 steals in two road wins over USC Upstate and NJIT.
 Preseason Atlantic Sun All-Conference Team

References

North Florida Ospreys men's basketball seasons
North Florida
North Florida Ospreys men's basketball
North Florida Ospreys men's basketball
North Florida